The 1977 West Virginia Mountaineers football team represented West Virginia University in the 1977 NCAA Division I football season. It was the Mountaineers' 85th overall season and they competed as an independent. The team was led by head coach Frank Cignetti Sr., in his second-year, and played their home games at Mountaineer Field in Morgantown, West Virginia. They finished the season with a record 5–6.

Schedule

Roster

References

West Virginia
West Virginia Mountaineers football seasons
Mountaineers